László Kiss (born 14 December 1940) is a Hungarian former swimmer. He competed in two events at the 1960 Summer Olympics.

References

1940 births
Living people
Hungarian male swimmers
Olympic swimmers of Hungary
Swimmers at the 1960 Summer Olympics
Swimmers from Budapest
20th-century Hungarian people
21st-century Hungarian people